Caveolin-3 is a protein that in humans is encoded by the CAV3 gene. Alternative splicing has been identified for this locus, with inclusion or exclusion of a differentially spliced intron. In addition, transcripts utilize multiple polyA sites and contain two potential translation initiation sites.

Function 

This gene encodes a caveolin family member, which functions as a component of the caveolae plasma membranes found in most cell types. Caveolin proteins are proposed to be scaffolding proteins for organizing and concentrating certain caveolin-interacting molecules.

Clinical significance 

Mutations identified in this gene lead to interference with protein oligomerization or intra-cellular routing, disrupting caveolae formation and resulting in Limb-Girdle muscular dystrophy type-1C (LGMD-1C), HyperCKemia, distal myopathy or rippling muscle disease (RMD). Other mutations in Caveolin causes Long QT Syndrome or familial hypertrophic cardiomyopathy, although the role of Cav3 in Long QT syndrome has recently been disputed.

Interactions
Caveolin 3 has been shown to interact with a range of different proteins, including, but not limited to:
 DAG1,
 DYSF,
 EGFR, and
 RYR1.

Structure 
Using transmission electron microscopy and single particle analysis methods, it has been shown that nine Caveolin-3 monomers assemble to form a complex that is toroidal in shape, ~16.5 nm in diameter and ~5.5 nm in height.

Cardiac physiology 
Caveolin-3 is one of three isoforms of the protein caveolin. Caveolin-3 is concentrated in the caveolae of myocytes, and modulates numerous metabolic processes including: nitric oxide synthesis, cholesterol metabolism, and cardiac myocytes contraction. There are many proteins that associate with caveolin-3, including ion channels and exchangers.

Associations with ion channels

ATP-dependent potassium channels 
In cardiac myocytes, caveolin-3 negatively regulates ATP-dependent potassium channels (KATP) localized in caveolae. KATP channel opening decreases significantly when interacting with caveolin-3; other isoforms of caveolin do not show this type of effect on KATP channels. The amount of KATP activation during times of biological stress influences the amount of cellular damage that will occur, thus regulation of caveolin-3 expression during these times influences the amount of cellular damage.

Sodium-calcium exchanger 
Caveolin-3 associates with the cardiac sodium-calcium exchanger (NCX) in caveolae of cardiac myocytes. This association occurs predominately in areas proximate to the peripheral membrane of cardiac myocytes. Interactions between caveolin-3 and cardiac NCX influence NCX-regulation of cellular signaling factors and excitation of cardiac myocytes.

L-Type calcium channel 
Caveolin-3 influences the opening of L-Type calcium channels (LTCC) which play a role in cardiac myocyte contraction. Disruption of interactions between caveolin-3 and its associated binding proteins has been shown to affect LTCC. Specifically, disruption of caveolin-3 decreases the basal and b2-adrenergic-stimulated opening probabilities of LTCC. This occurs by changing the PKA-mediated phosphorylation of caveolin-3-associated binding proteins, causing negative down-stream effects on LTCC activity.

Implications in disease 
Alterations in caveolin-3 expression have been implicated in the altered expression and regulation of numerous signaling molecules involved in cardiomyopathies. Disruption of caveolin-3 disturbs the structure of cardiac caveolae and blocks atrial natriuretic peptide (ANP) expression, a cardiac-related hormone involved in many functions including maintaining cellular homeostasis. Normal caveolin-3 expression under conditions of stress increases cardiac cellular levels of ANP, maintaining cardiac homeostasis. Mutations have been identified in the caveolin-3 gene that result in cardiomyopathies. Several of these mutations influence caveolin-3 function by reducing the expression of its cell-surface domains. Mutations resulting in loss-of-function of caveolin-3 cause cardiac myocyte hypertrophy, dilation of the heart, and depression of fractional shortening. Knockout of caveolin-3 genes are sufficient to induce these manifestations. Similarly, dominant-negative genotypes for caveolin-3 increase cardiac hypertrophy, whereas increased expression of caveolin-3 inhibits the ability of the heart to hypertrophy, implicating caveolin-3 as a negative regulator of cardiac hypertrophy. Overexpression of caveolin-3 leads to the development of cardiomyopathy, resulting in degeneration of cardiac tissue and manifesting pathologies due to the associated degeneration.

References

Further reading